Peter Struck may refer to:
 Peter Struck (politician)
 Peter Struck (classicist)